See Hybrid nuclear fusion for the proposed nuclear reactor.
A hybrid biological reactor (HBR) was developed which involved the introduction of a new phase of attached-biomass into a regular suspended-growth  system (activated sludge process) by addition of carriers to

the aeration tanks. A novel hybrid biological reactor which contained both suspended and attached-growth biomass was developed by introducing porous materials into a regular activated sludge unit and used for the treatment of domestic wastewater.  

A hybrid reactor is an anaerobic digester that combines a UASB reactor with an anaerobic filter. This combination is an advanced form enabling improved solid retention time in the treatment of waste water. This waste water can be built up in the secondary chamber and must be removed daily or an explosion is imminent to occur.

See also
Anaerobic digester types

Anaerobic digester types